Psallus quercus is a Palearctic species of  true bug

References
 

Phylini
Hemiptera of Europe
Insects described in 1856